Gideon Joseph Ng (born November 15, 1963) is a Chinese-Canadian table tennis player.

He competed at the 1988 (men's singles and doubles), 1992 (men's singles), and 1996 Summer Olympics (men's singles and doubles).

References

External links
 
 
 
 

1963 births
Living people
Canadian male table tennis players
Olympic table tennis players of Canada
Table tennis players at the 1988 Summer Olympics
Table tennis players at the 1992 Summer Olympics
Table tennis players at the 1996 Summer Olympics
Pan American Games medalists in table tennis
Pan American Games gold medalists for Canada
Pan American Games silver medalists for Canada
Pan American Games bronze medalists for Canada
Sportspeople from Toronto
Table tennis players at the 1983 Pan American Games
Table tennis players at the 1987 Pan American Games
Table tennis players at the 1991 Pan American Games
Table tennis players at the 1995 Pan American Games
Medalists at the 1983 Pan American Games
Medalists at the 1987 Pan American Games
Medalists at the 1991 Pan American Games
Medalists at the 1995 Pan American Games